Querétaro Fútbol Club, also called Gallos Blancos de Querétaro, is a Mexican professional football club based in Querétaro City. Querétaro plays in the Liga MX, the top tier of Mexican football league system. Their colors are blue, black, and white and the team mascot is a rooster. Although the club has not had significant success in Mexico, the team has featured stars including Ronaldinho and Antonio Valencia.

History

Foundation 

In 1949, the Mexican Football Federation proposed the idea of creating a "Segunda División" to expand interest in the game and to create a development program for the first division.  Querétaro received an invitation to participate. Alfonso "pachín" Niembro, then president of the Asociación Queretana de Fútbol, and Raúl Ayala, who represented Querétaro at the national level, with help from large numbers of locally based amateurs, decided to organize a tournament, the winner of which would represent the city of Querétaro in the new division. The tournament was won by a team named "Los Piratas", who became "Club Querétaro A.C."  They joined Irapuato, Zacatepec, Toluca, Morelia and La Piedad as the founders of the Segunda División.

The team's official foundation is July 8, 1950. Later journalist Herrera "Periquín" Pozas bestowed the nickname of Gallos Blancos (White Roosters) based on the club's "willingness to fight for every ball" and their characteristic white uniforms. The team quickly developed a large local fanbase. Querétaro F.C. has come close to promotion on many occasions; one of the most memorable was in 1976 when they reached the Second Division Final and played against Atlante F.C.

The Atletas Campesinos era 

It was in the middle 70s when the foundation of Estudiantes took place, a team composed mostly by students that wanted to gain a name in the Mexican league and that also became a good rival to Gallos Blancos; but then in 1977 Armando Presa bought both teams and changed their name to Atletas Campesinos, getting a well-groomed composition of young players with a dream of a future in the professional football and very experienced players; that same year they showed a notable performance. But it was the next season when the team became a "maquinita de jugar fútbol" (football-playing-machine) with a combination of experience and youth well stimulated economically; as the scores were better, the better they would be paid. Then Armando Presa decided that although the team was in the right way it was necessary the hand of a more experienced manager, so current manager Antonio Ascencio stepped down and Antonio Carbajal took the team with a great offering if the team reached Primera División.

It came the day back on June 22, 1980, when "Atletas Campesinos" would face Osos Grises at the Segunda División final game (Osos got a valuable tie at Municipal stadium, former ground of Querétaro's teams) which was the favorite team, but Campesinos gave a great surprise winning with a 2–1 score (goals made by Carlos Cerritos and Jorge Gaspar). Antonio Carbajal was carried off on the shoulders of the crowd, Antonio Ascencio and their boys wept of happiness. They could not believe it, finally they were the champions.

The Atletas Campesinos team got into the hearts of the people since they gave them a satisfaction that no team had done before: give to the city of Querétaro a Primera División team. The Atletas Campesinos were already at the maximum circuit with the idea of making a combination of a team with the best men already at the league and make a great campaign, but it didn't happen: the team started to lose their games and finally it was sold to the "Sindicato de Petroleros de Ciudad Madero". Then during the 1982–83 season Querétaro lost the Atletas Campesinos team and it became the Tampico Madero team.

The UAQ Gallos Blancos era 

In the early 1980s it was given to the Autonomous University of Queretaro the team's rights of management and became the UAQ Gallos Blancos. This team became a "golden breed" of players like René Montalvo, Salvador "Zurdo" Ochoa and José de Jesús Torruco. In fact, the "UAQ Gallos Blancos" arrived to another Segunda División final in 1987, now against the Correcaminos UAT, but after playing the first game of the series at the Estadio Marte R. Gómez (with a 0–0 result), the team suffered an accident while returning from Ciudad Victoria to Santiago de Querétaro, where three very important players lost their lives. Even though the final match was moved a month, the team lost the series on a third match in the Estadio Azteca.

During the next days, the team became a youth/reserve squad of Cruz Azul, providing many players that later became Primera División football stars. Later, after many failures to get into the Primera División, the Autonomous University of Queretaro went into an economic crisis which caused it to sell the team to a north group of business men from Hermosillo, Sonora and in this way Querétaro lost again one of their most loved and memorable teams.

The Cobras de Querétaro era 

Later after the construction of the Estadio La Corregidora stadium in the middle eighties, one of the most important Mexican TV broadcasters decided to manage a Segunda División team who received the name of "Cobras de Querétaro". This team obtained the Primera División category by the hand of Jorge "Coco" Gómez back in 1986 but they lasted only one season because at the end of the 86–87 season they went back to Segunda División and the team was moved to Ciudad Juárez.

The Club Querétaro era 

In 1988 another team was created in the city, named "Club Querétaro". Quickly became a fierce rival to the "UAQ Gallos Blancos". These two teams were playing on the Second Division. After many unsuccessful seasons, footballer José Antonio García bought the Tampico Madero franchise and put it into the Corregidora stadium under the name of "Club Querétaro". During this season the team had one of the most remarkable roster which included Rubén Omar Romano, Sergio Bueno, Miguel Herrera, Sergio Almaguer and many more, all of them under the direction of Ricardo La Volpe.

The team made a modest season and was sold to a group of business men from Querétaro (Vázquez Mellado family) who, despite all of their efforts, lost their category and in 1994 and finally went back into Segunda División. Then in 1994, because of the problems of Antonio Peláez Pier with the administration of Tamaulipas stadium, the Tampico Madero team moved to Querétaro under the name of T.M. Gallos Blancos but that same season the team was relegated to Segunda División under the hand of José Camacho and Juan de Dios Castillo.

Back in 1998 "Club Querétaro" and "UAQ Gallos Blancos" merged into one club and formed a team that played for three years with the original name of "Gallos Blancos de Querétaro" (White Roosters of Querétaro) until 2002.

Querétaro F.C. (2002–2012) 

In 2002, a Primera División team, CF La Piedad, had to move from the city of La Piedad to play in Santiago de Querétaro, where the team stayed for two years under the name "Querétaro F.C.". The team had a modest performance during four seasons; then in 2004 the F.M.F. decided to reduce the number of teams in the Primera División from twenty to eighteen, and decided to eliminate two teams with the worst financial situation: Querétaro F.C. and Club Irapuato. That same year, Querétaro F.C. bought the franchise of a Primera A defunct team: Zacatepec.

In 2005 Querétaro F.C. won the Primera A "Torneo de Clausura" and played the promotion game against San Luis F.C. The game at San Luis Potosí resulted in a defeat with a 3–2 score. The suspicious way this game was conducted and the violence suffered by Querétaro's fans in hands of San Luis fans resulted in a fierce rivalry with this team.

On May 28, 2006, Querétaro F.C. was promoted to Mexico's Primera División, after beating Puebla F.C. in the Clausura 2006 tournament and the 2005/2006 Primera A promotion play-off by a 5–1 final score. But on April 29, 2007, the "Gallos Blancos" were relegated after failing to achieve 6 out of 9 points in the final 3 games in a fierce fight with Santos Laguna. A combination of their defeat in the final game against Club Atlas and a victory of Santos Laguna against Cruz Azul caused their relegation to Primera A.

After a 2007–08 season to forget in Primera A when the team couldn't make it to the play-offs, things changed in the Apertura 2008 tournament. Querétaro F.C. became the most dangerous offensive (including best striker: Mauro Néstor Gerk) and got the most points since their return to Primera A. After beating Correcaminos UAT and Club Tijuana, Querétaro F.C. won their third Championship against Club Irapuato (which was the most effective defense of the tournament) by a 2–0 score.  After their championship and a season filled with ups and downs, Querétaro F.C. played against Mérida F.C. (the current champion) the Promotion Play-off game which determines which team will play in Primera División. After winning their first game against Mérida F.C. 2–1, the team played their second game at Mérida and lost but tied on aggregate. The teams went into extra time and eventually into penalty shots. Everyone scored and goalkeeper José Guadalupe Martínez stopped one of the Mérida F.C. shots. Winning the game on penalties the team acquired the right to play the next tournament in Primera División.

Querétaro F.C. still in Primera División 

At the end of the Clausura 2013 tournament, Querétaro F.C. ended up in the last position of the relegation table and therefore was to be relegated to the Liga de Ascenso for the upcoming Apertura 2013. However, the owner of Grupo Delfines bought Jaguares de Chiapas from TV Azteca and relocated the team to Querétaro to keep the city in the Primera Division. The move prompted Club San Luis to move to Tuxtla Gutiérrez, retaining top-flight football in that state. The current Querétaro F.C. franchise assumed the original franchise's television partnership with the Televisa family of networks (Querétaro F.C. was the last Liga MX team to have Televisa as its television partner before the privatization of TV Azteca.)

After owner Amado Yáñez was investigated for defrauding Banamex, the team was placed into government administration, from which Grupo Imagen, a media conglomerate, and Grupo Empresarial Ángeles, its parent company, bought the squad. Immediately, speculation swirled that Imagen was soon to pull Querétaro FC from Televisa, and with the launch of Imagen Televisión in October 2016, the Gallos Blancos had a new broadcast home.

In 2015, this team made it to the finals for the first time in the domestic league competition with the help of Danilinho, Emanuel Villa, and Ronaldinho, in the 2015 Clausura. The team faced Santos Laguna in the first leg losing 5–0, in the second leg Querétaro were able to pull off a 3–0 victory at home, but fell short by 2 goals helping them qualify to the CONCACAF Champions League for the first time.

On March 5, 2022, during a match between Querétaro and Atlas, a riot broke out between fans attending the match at Querétaro's stadium. Video posted on social media showed groups of men beating, kicking, dragging and stripping victims. According to the Querétaro state's civil protection agency, at least 22 men were injured. League play for the following day was suspended, and the next Monday, five officials from the police and civil defence were suspended, the private company who were hired by the club would also have its contracts cancelled, and a ban on attending away games may be imposed on Querétaro fans.

On 8 March 2022, the Liga MX banned fans from attending Queretaro's home matches for up to a year, as well as banning its barras (a group or club of fans) for up to three years, and also required Queretaro to be sold to another owner after its then-current owners, Manuel Velarde, Gabriel Solares, Alfonso Solloa, Javier Solloa, and Greg Taylor, were banned from conducting league-related activities for up to five years. It has since been transferred to Grupo Caliente, which also owns Club Tijuana, in which the group must sell Queretaro by the end of the year, otherwise, the league will take ownership of the club. It was also fined MX$1.5 million (US$70,450) and its youth and women's teams must play all matches behind closed doors.

Stadium 

Initially the team played at the 10,000 seat Estadio Municipal de Querétaro. The team played there for about 35 years, and it remains in use by recreational and local squads, along with QFC's youth team with a reduced capacity.

Querétaro F.C. play their home games at Estadio Corregidora de Querétaro in Santiago de Querétaro, which opened in 1985 and was built in a Mexican-West German collaboration. Seating 35,575 and built for the 1986 FIFA World Cup (of which it hosted four matches for), it is designed to fill its capacity in fifteen minutes, then evacuate the same size crowd in seven minutes.

Popularity

Supporters 

Querétaro F.C. has always been a family-supported team, which includes several "porras" like "Esperanza Blanca", "Tradicional" and "La Corregidora". But recently one of the fastest growing "barras" has been the Resistencia Albiazul, formerly known as "Rebeldía Queretana", whose chants or "porras" have become a powerful encouragement to the team and a classic background of La Corregidora stadium. It was the best "barra" of Primera A and now is one of the bests among Mexico's football league.

Rivalries 

Because of the short distance between the cities in the area known as el Bajío, there have always been rivalries with teams such as Irapuato and Celaya F.C., and Salamanca F.C. in the past. However, the fiercest rivalries are with León, Atlas F.C. and Atlético San Luis (formerly fulfilled with San Luis F.C.).

Kit history 

 Home kit: Black and blue teriped shirt with black shorts and socks.
 Away kit: White shirt with black shorts and white socks.

 First kit history

 Third kit history

Honours 

  Liga MX
Runners-up: Clausura 2015

Copa MX
Winners: Apertura 2016

 Supercopa MX
Winners: 2017

 Ascenso MX
Winners: Clausura 2005, Clausura 2006, Apertura 2008

 Promotion playoff
Winners: 2005–06, 2008–09

Personnel

Management

Coaching staff

Players

First-team squad

Out on loan

Reserve teams

References

External links 

  

 
Football clubs in Querétaro
Association football clubs established in 1950
1950 establishments in Mexico
Ascenso MX teams
Liga MX teams
Querétaro City